The 107th Massachusetts General Court, consisting of the Massachusetts Senate and the Massachusetts House of Representatives, met in 1886 during the governorship of George D. Robinson. Albert E. Pillsbury served as president of the Senate and John Q. A. Brackett served as speaker of the House.

Senators

Representatives

 Julius Caesar Chappelle

See also
 49th United States Congress
 List of Massachusetts General Courts

References

Further reading
  (includes description of legislature)

External links
 
 

Political history of Massachusetts
Massachusetts legislative sessions
massachusetts
1886 in Massachusetts